The Bush Inn is an Australian pub located within New Norfolk, Tasmania. It is one of the oldest pubs in Australia, and is thought by some to be the oldest continuously operating pub in Australia. It is particularly notable as it has achieved Australian Heritage listing.

Some sources say the building has operated as a pub since 1815. However, Freeland thinks a more likely date is 1825. in April that year a Hobart newspaper noted that at New Norfolk "a widow lady named Bridger has just completed a very commodious two-storey house of public entertainment, which is deservedly well frequented." In October of the same year,  Ann Bridger received a licence to sell spirits, wine and beer at the sign of the Bush [Inn] at New Norfolk.

See also

List of oldest companies in Australia

References

Pubs in Tasmania
1815 establishments in Australia
Australian companies established in 1815
Commercial buildings completed in 1815